Merriwether St. John Williams (born March 28, 1968) is an American television writer, former Nickelodeon executive and actress, who has worked on television shows such as Happy Tree Friends, SpongeBob SquarePants,  My Little Pony: Friendship Is Magic, Camp Lazlo, and Adventure Time.

Career 
After leaving the executive ranks at Nickelodeon, she wrote outlines for SpongeBob SquarePants and a couple episodes of The Angry Beavers. In 2003, she developed and became the show-runner and head writer of the short-lived Showtime animated sitcom Free For All. In 2005, she became the head of story for Camp Lazlo at Cartoon Network.

More recently, Williams has written several episodes for Adventure Time, Littlest Pet Shop, My Little Pony: Friendship Is Magic, and Pig Goat Banana Cricket. She has also written an episode for Johnny Test and Pound Puppies. She is currently co-producer and writer on Billy Dilley's Super-Duper Subterranean Summer.

She has also co-written the films Good Time Max, The Ape, and Fool's Gold with actor James Franco.

Filmography

Television

Film

References

External links
 

American women screenwriters
Living people
American television writers
1968 births
20th-century American writers
21st-century American writers
21st-century American women writers
20th-century American women writers
Primetime Emmy Award winners
American women television writers